Saint-Jean-de-Minervois (Languedocien: Sant Joan de Menerbés) is a commune in the Hérault department in the Occitanie region in southern France.

When it was created in 1908, this commune's name was Saint-Jean-de-Pardailhan.

Its name was changed in 1936 to allow a better marketing of its famous muscat wine, the Muscat de Saint-Jean-de-Minervois, recognized since 1949.

Population

See also
Communes of the Hérault department

References

Communes of Hérault